John Boccieri (born October 5, 1969) is an American politician who was appointed to fill the 59th district seat in the Ohio House of Representatives on September 29, 2015. He left office after an unsuccessful run for Ohio State Senate in 2018. He is a member of the Democratic Party, and previously served in the Ohio State Senate and the Ohio House of Representatives. Boccieri resides in Poland, Ohio.

Early life and career
Boccieri was born in Youngstown where he graduated from Ursuline High School in 1988. He attended St. Bonaventure University in New York, graduating with a B.S. in 1992, after which he played minor league baseball in the Frontier League. Following one season of baseball, he began his career in government. After working as staff for several members of the Ohio House of Representatives, Boccieri joined the United States Air Force as a second lieutenant. He also earned two master's degrees (M.A. 1992, M.P.A. 1996) from Webster University in St. Louis, Missouri. Boccieri flew the C-130 Hercules as a member of the Air Force Reserve. He has been forward deployed several times and served in Operation Enduring Freedom and Operation Iraqi Freedom, causing him to take leaves of absence from the Ohio Legislature.

After leaving the active duty Air Force, he re-entered politics, running for and winning the 61st District of the Ohio House of Representatives in 2000. In 2006, he won a seat in the Ohio State Senate in District 33; he was unopposed.

United States Congress
There had been speculation throughout 2007 that Boccieri would challenge U.S. Representative Ralph Regula to represent the 16th District in the U.S. House, a seat Regula had held for 36 years. When Regula announced his retirement in late 2007, Boccieri faced an open field. He defeated State Representative Mary Cirelli with 64% of the vote in the Democratic primary. He faced and defeated State Senator Kirk Schuring in the general election. He was the first Democrat to represent this district in 58 years.

On October 30, 2010, Boccieri ran offstage while former President Bill Clinton was giving a speech after learning that his pregnant wife was in labor.

On November 2, 2010, Boccieri lost his bid for a second term in Congress after being  defeated by Republican businessman Jim Renacci. He was defeated handily in an overwhelmingly Republican year; Boccieri received only 40% of the vote, compared to 52% for Renacci (a Libertarian candidate took the remaining votes).

Return to Ohio House of Representatives
On September 29, 2015, Boccieri was appointed to the Ohio House of Representatives, filling the 59th District vacancy caused by the resignation of Ron Gerberry. He did not run for re-election in 2018, instead opting to run for the 33rd District seat in the Ohio State Senate, losing to Michael Rulli in the general election.

References

External links
 

1969 births
Living people
Democratic Party Ohio state senators
Democratic Party members of the Ohio House of Representatives
United States Air Force officers
United States Air Force personnel of the Iraq War
Military personnel from Ohio
Politicians from Youngstown, Ohio
St. Bonaventure University alumni
Webster University alumni
Democratic Party members of the United States House of Representatives from Ohio
People from Alliance, Ohio
21st-century American politicians
United States Air Force reservists
People from Poland, Ohio